The Black List is an annual survey of the "most-liked" motion picture screenplays not yet produced. It has been published every year since 2005 on the second Friday of December by Franklin Leonard, a development executive who subsequently worked at Universal Pictures and Will Smith's Overbrook Entertainment. The website states that these are not necessarily "the best" screenplays, but rather "the most liked", since it is based on a survey of studio and production company executives.

Of the more than 1,000 screenplays The Black List has included since 2005, 440 have been produced as theatrical films, including Argo, American Hustle, Juno, The King's Speech, Slumdog Millionaire, Spotlight, The Revenant, The Descendants, and Hell or High Water. The produced films have together grossed over $30 billion, and been nominated for 241 Academy Awards and 205 Golden Globe Awards, winning 50 and 40 respectively. As of the 92nd Academy Awards, four of the last 10 Academy Awards for Best Picture went to scripts featured on a previous Black List, as well as 12 of the last 20 screenwriting Oscars (Original and Adapted Screenplays). Additionally, writers whose scripts are listed often find that they are more readily hired for other jobs, even if their listed screenplays still have not been produced, such as Jim Rash and Nat Faxon, two of the writers of the screenplay for The Descendants, who had an earlier screenplay make the list. Slate columnist David Haglund has written that the list's reputation as a champion for "beloved but challenging" works has been overstated, since "these are screenplays that are already making the Hollywood rounds. And while, as a rule, they have not yet been produced, many of them are already in production."

History

The first Black List was compiled in 2005 by Franklin Leonard, at the time working as a development executive for Leonardo DiCaprio's production company, Appian Way Productions. He emailed about 75 fellow development executives and asked them to name the ten best unproduced screenplays they read that year. To thank them for participating, he compiled the list and sent it to the respondents. The name The Black List was a nod to his heritage as an African American man, and also as a reference to the writers who were barred during the McCarthy era as part of the Hollywood blacklist.

The screenplays to top The Black List, from 2005 to 2022 respectively, are: Things We Lost in the Fire; The Brigands of Rattleborge; Recount; The Beaver; The Muppet Man; College Republicans; The Imitation Game; Draft Day; Holland, Michigan; Catherine the Great; Bubbles; Blond Ambition; Ruin; Frat Boy Genius; Move On; Headhunter; Cauliflower, and Pure.

On January 27, 2019, at the 2019 Sundance Film Festival, it was announced that the LGBT media advocacy group GLAAD had partnered with The Black List to create The GLAAD List, a new curated list of the most promising unmade LGBT-inclusive scripts in Hollywood.

Structure
The Black List tallies the number of "likes" various screenplays are given by development executives, and then ranks them accordingly. The most-liked screenplay is The Imitation Game, which topped the list in 2011 with 133 likes; it went on to win the Academy Award for Best Adapted Screenplay at the 87th Academy Awards in 2015.

Films on the Black List

More than 440 screenplays have been put into production after appearing on The Black List. These include:

2005 Black List
(120/286 screenplays have been put in production)

 One Percent More Humid (2017)
 21 (2008)
 The American (2010) – then titled A Very Private Gentleman, by Laura Harrington
 All God's Children Can Dance (2009) – then titled K-Town Super Frog
 Altered Carbon (2018–2020) – adapted to television
 Anonymous (2011) – then titled Soul of the Age
 Armored (2009)
 Babel (2006)
 Balls Out: Gary the Tennis Coach (2009)
 Black Snake Moan (2006)
 Blades of Glory (2007)
 Blind (2016)
 Blood Diamond (2006)
 Breach (2007)
 The Brothers Solomon (2007)
 The Bucket List (2007)
 Carnival Row (2019) – then titled A Killing on Carnival Row; adapted to television
 Chapter 27 (2007)
 Charlie Wilson's War (2007)
 Charlie Bartlett (2007)
 Cougars, Inc. (2011) – then titled Mother's Little Helpers
 Dan in Real Life (2007)
 Dangerous Parking (2007)
 Dark Around the Stars (2013) – then titled Stars
 Death at a Funeral (2010)
 Delirium (2018) – then titled Home
 Dexter (2006–2013) – adapted to television
 Disturbia (2007)
 The Dirt (2019)
 Dream House (2011)
 Eight Below (2006) – then titled Antarctica
 Ender's Game (2013)
 The Expendables (2010) – then titled Barrow
 Factory Girl (2006)
 Fanboys (2009)
 The Fast and the Furious: Tokyo Drift (2006)
 The Forger (2014)
 Freedomland (2006)
 Fur (2006)
 The Game Plan (2007) – then titled Daddy's Little Girl
 Get Low (2009)
 The Good Lie (2014) – then titled Lost Boys of Sudan
 A Good Old Fashioned Orgy (2011)
 Hall Pass (2011)
 Hancock (2008) – then titled Tonight, He Comes
 Harold (2008)
 The Hawk Is Dying (2006)
 The Highwaymen (2019)
 The Hoax (2006)
 Horrible Bosses (2011)
 Hot Rod (2007)
 The Hunting Party (2007) – then titled Spring Break in Bosnia
 Infamous (2006)
 In Secret (2013) – then titled Terese Raquin
 Juno (2007)
 Killer Elite (2011)
 King of California (2007)
 The Kingdom (2007)
 The Kite Runner (2007)
 Lars and the Real Girl (2007)
 The Ledge (2011)
 Legendary (2010) – then titled Oxley's Road
 Life After Beth (2014) – then titled Winged Life
 The Life Before Her Eyes (2007) – then titled In Bloom
 Little Children (2006)
 Little Miss Sunshine (2006)
 Love in the Time of Cholera (2007)
 Lucky Number Slevin (2006)
 The Maiden Heist (2009) – then titled Lonely Maiden
 Mama's Boy (2007)
 Margaret (2011)
 Married Life (2007) – then titled Marriage
 Meet Bill (2007) – then titled Bill
 Meet Dave (2008) – then titled Starship Dave
 Message from the King (2016)
 Michael Clayton (2007)
 A Million Little Pieces (2019)
 The Mummy: Tomb of the Dragon Emperor (2008)
 The Mysteries of Pittsburgh (2008)
 Nacho Libre (2006)
 Nebraska (2013)
 Nick & Norah's Infinite Playlist (2008)
 Not Another Happy Ending (2013) – then titled Happy Endings
 Notes on a Scandal (2006)
 The Number 23 (2007)
 The Only Living Boy in New York (2017)
 The Other Boleyn Girl (2008)
 Pathfinder (2007)
 Passengers (2008)
 Peacock (2010)
 Post Grad (2009) – then titled Ticket to Ride
 The Prestige (2006)
 The Proposal (2009)
 The Promotion (2008)
 The Pursuit of Happyness (2006)
 Pu-239 (2006)
 Quid Pro Quo (2008)
 The Queen (2006)
 Reservation Road (2007)
 Righteous Kill (2008)
 The Sasquatch Gang (2006) – then titled The Sasquatch Dumpling Gang
 Stardust (2007)
 The Starling (2021)
 Stop-Loss (2008)
 Studio 60 on the Sunset Strip (2006–2007) – then titled Studio 7
 The Ten (2007)
 Tenure (2009)
 Things We Lost in the Fire (2007)
 The Time Traveler's Wife (2009)
 Turistas (2006)
 Under the Skin (2013)
 Wanted (2008)
 We Are Marshall (2006)
 The Whistleblower (2010)
 Wild Hogs (2007)
 The Words (2012)
 World Trade Center (2006)
 X-Men Origins: Wolverine (2009)
 The Year of Getting to Know Us (2008)
 Youth in Revolt (2009)
 Zodiac (2007)

2006 Black List
(40/87 screenplays have been put into production)

 3:10 to Yuma (2007)
 500 Days of Summer (2009)
 A Mighty Heart (2007)
 All About Steve (2009)
 Assassination of a High School President (2008)
 Away We Go (2009) – then titled This Must Be the Place
 The Brothers Bloom (2008)
 The Bucket List (2007)
 Changeling (2008)
 Crash Pad (2017) – then titled Bim Bam Baby
 Curve (2015)
 Dear Dictator (2018) – then titled Coup d'Etat
 Death at a Funeral (2007)
 The Devil's Double (2011)
 The Disappearance of Eleanor Rigby (2013)
 The Diving Bell and the Butterfly (2007)
 Dracula Untold (2014) – then titled Dracula Year Zero
 The Fighter (2010)
 Frost/Nixon (2008)
 Get Smart (2008)
 Hanna (2011)
 Harold & Kumar Escape from Guantanamo Bay (2008)
 In Bruges (2008)
 Life of Pi (2012)
 Lions for Lambs (2007)
 The Men Who Stare at Goats (2009)
 The Messenger (2009)
 Natural Selection (2009)
 The Other Woman (2009) – then titled Love and Other Impossible Pursuits
 Open Grave (2013)
 Rendition (2007)
 Scott Pilgrim vs. the World (2010) – then titled Scott Pilgrim's Precious Little Life
 Seven Pounds (2008)
 Seven Psychopaths (2012)
 She's Out of My League (2010)
 State of Play (2009)
 Superbad (2007)
 There Will Be Blood (2007)
 Walk Hard: The Dewey Cox Story (2007)
 Year of the Dog (2007)

2007 Black List

 The Answer Man (2009)
 Adventureland (2009)
 All Good Things (2010)
 Big Eyes (2014)
 Blindness (2008)
 Blitz (2008)
 Bohemian Rhapsody (2018)
 The Book of Eli (2010)
 The Book of Love (2016)
 Burn After Reading (2008)
 Burnt (2015)
 Charlie Countryman (2013)
 Clash of the Titans (2010)
 Dear John (2010)
 Demolition (2015)
 Dirty Girl (2010)
 Doubt (2008)
 The Duchess (2008)
 Duplicity  (2009)
 Eagle Eye (2008)
 Felt (2017)
 Genius (2016)
 The Hangover (2009)
 Happy. Thank You. More. Please. (2010)
 Hitchcock (2012)
 How to Lose Friends & Alienate People (2008)
 The Ides of March (2011)
 The Invention of Lying (2009)
 Invictus (2009)
 Jack Ryan: Shadow Recruit (2014) – then titled Dubai
 Jennifer's Body (2009)
 Justice League (2017)
 Last Chance Harvey (2008)
 Let It Fall: Los Angeles 1982–1992 (2017)
 Love & Other Drugs (2010)
 Management (2009)
 Never Let Me Go (2010)
 Orphan (2009)
 Passengers (2016)
 Recount (2008)
 The Revenant (2015)
 The Road (2009)
 Salt (2010)
 Selma (2014)
 Slumdog Millionaire (2008)
 Source Code (2011)
 The Town (2010)
 Valkyrie (2008)
 The Wackness (2008)
 The Way, Way Back (2013)
 Whip It (2009)
 The Wolf of Wall Street (2013)
 World War Z (2013)
 The Wrestler (2008)
 Yes Man (2008)
 Zombieland (2009)

2008 Black List
(39/105 screenplays have been put into production)

 47 Ronin (2013)
 50/50 (2011) – then titled I'm With Cancer
 A.C.O.D. (2013) – then titled ACOD: Adult Children of Divorce
 All I Wish (2017) – then titled A Little Something for Your Birthday
 Bachelorette (2012)
 The Back-up Plan (2010) – then titled Plan B
 Bad Teacher (2011)
 The Beaver (2011)
 Big Hole
 Broken City (2013)
 Butter (2011)
 Child 44 (2015)
 Cop Out (2010) – then titled A Couple of Dicks
 Date and Switch (2014) – then titled Gay Dude
 The Debt (2010)
 The Descendants (2011)
 Easy A (2010)
 Everything Must Go (2010)
 The F Word (2013) – then titled The F-Word
 Foxcatcher (2014)
 The Fourth Kind (2009)
 Galahad
 Going the Distance (2010)
 Hope Springs (2012) – then titled Untitled Vanessa Taylor Project
 Inglourious Basterds (2009)
 Killing Season (2013) – then titled Shrapnel
 London Boulevard (2010)
 Inferno: A Linda Lovelace Story
 No Strings Attached (2011) – then titled Fuckbuddies
 Nowhere Boy (2009)
 The Oranges (2011)
 Our Brand Is Crisis (2015)
 Out of the Furnace (2013) – then titled The Low Dweller
 Remember Me (2010) – then titled Memoirs
 Sherlock Holmes (2009)
 Sleeping Beauty (2011)
 Unlocked (2017)
 Up in the Air (2009)
 What's Your Number? (2011) – then titled Twenty Times a Lady
 Winter's Discontent
 Worth (2020) – then titled What Is Life Worth?

2009 Black List
(42/97 screenplays have been put into production)

 2 Guns (2013)
 30 Minutes or Less (2011)
 Arthur (2011)
 The Baytown Outlaws (2012) – then titled Baytown Disco
 Booksmart (2019)
 Buried (2010)
 Cedar Rapids (2011)
 Celeste and Jesse Forever (2012)
 Cut Bank (2014)
 Dark Was the Night (2014) – then titled The Trees
 Desperados (2020)
 Due Date (2010)
 The Duel (2016) – then titled By Way of Helena
 Feud (2017–present) – then titled Best Actress; adapted to television
 Gangster Squad (2013) – then titled LA REX
 The Guilt Trip (2012) – then titled My Mother’s Curse
 Hanna (2011)
 If I Stay (2014)
 The King's Speech (2010)
 The Kings of Summer (2013) –    then titled Toy's House
 The Last Stand (2013)
 Lawless (2012) – then titled The Wettest County
 Pawn Sacrifice (2014)
 Prisoners (2013)
 Red Riding Hood (2011) – then titled The Girl With the Red Riding Hood
 Restless (2011)
 Seeking Justice (2011) – then titled The Hungry Rabbit Jumps
 Shimmer Lake (2017)
 The Sitter (2011)
 The Social Network (2010)
 The Spectacular Now (2013)
 Take This Waltz (2011)
 That's My Boy (2012) – then titled I Hate You Dad
 The To Do List (2013) – then titled The Hand Job
 The True Memoirs of an International Assassin (2016)
 The Umbrella Academy – screenplay by Mark Bomback
 The Vatican Tapes (2015)
 The Voices (2014)
 Wall Street: Money Never Sleeps (2010) – then titled Wall Street 2: Money Never Sleeps
 The Watch (2012) – then titled Neighborhood Watch
 Water for Elephants (2011)
 Z for Zachariah (2015)

2010 Black List
(44/76 screenplays have been put into production)

 Abduction (2011)
 Abraham Lincoln: Vampire Hunter (2012)
 American Hustle (2013) – then titled American Bullshit
 Argo (2012)
 ATM (2012)
 Better Living Through Chemistry (2014)
 The Butler (2013)
 Can You Keep a Secret? (2019) – screenplay by Megan Martin
 Chronicle (2012)
 Cinema Verite (2011)
 Crazy, Stupid, Love (2011)
 Danny Collins (2015) – then titled Imagine
 Die in a Gunfight (2021)
 Edge of Tomorrow (2014) – then titled All You Need Is Kill, by Dante Harper
 Everly (2014)
 Freaks of Nature (2015) – then titled Kitchen Sink
 Fun Size (2012)
 Gangster Squad (2013) – then titled LA REX
 Get a Job (2016)
 Gold (2016)
 The Hunger Games (2012) – then titled Hunger Games
 The Impossible (2012)
 Jackie (2016)
 The Last Son (2021) – then titled The Last Son of Isaac LeMay
 The Last Witch Hunter (2015)
 Lola Versus (2012)
 Looper (2012)
 Margin Call (2011)
 Murder of a Cat (2014)
 One Day (2011)
 Oz the Great and Powerful (2013) – then titled Oz: The Great and Powerful
 People Like Us (2012) – then titled Welcome to People
 Paint (2023)
 Prom (2011)
 Safe House (2012)
 Scouts Guide to the Zombie Apocalypse (2015) – then titled Boy Scouts vs. Zombies
 Search Party (2014) – then titled Road to Nardo
 Serena (2014)
 Snow White and the Huntsman (2012)
 Stoker (2013)
 That Awkward Moment (2014) – then titled Are We Officially Dating?
 Triple 9 (2016) – then titled 999
 What Happened to Monday (2017) – then titled What Happened to Monday?

2011 Black List
(28/71 screenplays have been put into production)

 77
 The Accountant (2016)
 Arizona (2018)
 Bad Words (2013)
 Before I Fall (2017)
 Bethlehem
 Beyond The Pale
 The Big Stone Grid
 The Broken Hearts Gallery (2020)
 Breyton Ave
 Christo
 Cities of Refuge
 Crazy for the Storm
 The Current War (2017)
 Dead of Winter
 Desperate Hours
 Dirty Grandpa (2016)
 Django Unchained (2012)
 The Duff (2015)
 El Fuego Caliente
 The End
 Ezekiel Moss
 Father Daughter Time: A Tale of Armed Robbery and Eskimo Kisses
 Father Figures (2017) – then titled Bastards
 Flarsky
 The Flamingo Thief
 Friend of Bill
 Future Man (2017–2020) – adapted to television
 Good Kids (2016)
 Grace of Monaco (2014)
 Grim Night
 The Gun Eaters
 Guys Night
 He's F****n Perfect
 Hidden (2015)
 The Hitman's Bodyguard (2017)
 Home By Christmas
 How to Disappear Completely
 Hyperdrive
 The Imitation Game (2014)
 In the Event of a Moon Disaster
 Jane Got a Gun (2015)
 The Knoll
 The Last Drop
 The Last Witness
 Line of Sight
 Little White Corvette
 Long Shot (2019)
 Maggie (2015)
 A Many Splintered Thing
 Murders and Acquisitions
 On A Clear Day
 The Outsider (2018)
 Pinocchio
 Playing It Cool (2015)
 Powell
 The Pretty One (2013)
 Saving Mr. Banks (2013)
 Self/less (2015)
 Sex Tape (2014)
 The Slackfi Project
 St. Vincent (2014) – then titled St. Vincent de Van Nuys
 The Three Misfortunes of Geppetto
 Two Night Stand (2014)
 The Wedding
 Untitled Arizona Project
 Untitled Hlavin Heist
 When the Streetlights Go On (2020–present) – adapted to television

2012 Black List

 Arrival (2016)
 Blockers (2018)
 Come and Find Me (2016)
 Don't Make Me Go (2022)
 Draft Day (2014)
 The Equalizer (2014)
 Extremely Wicked, Shockingly Evil and Vile (2019)
 Fathers and Daughters (2015)
 The Fault in Our Stars (2014)
 Flower (2017)
 Hell or High Water (2016)
 Jojo Rabbit (2019)
 The Judge (2014)
 The Keeping Room (2014)
 Me and Earl and the Dying Girl (2015)
 The Outcasts (2017)
 Project Almanac (2015)
 Run All Night (2015)
 Sand Castle (2017)
 Shut In (2016)
 Stockholm, Pennsylvania (2015)
 The Survivalist (2015)
 Sweet Virginia (2017)
 Transcendence (2014)
 Whiplash (2014)

2013 Black List
(15/72 screenplays have been put into production)

 1969: A Space Odyssey or How Kubrick Learned To Stop Worrying And Land On The Moon
 A Beautiful Day in the Neighborhood (2019)
 American Sniper (2014)
 The Autopsy of Jane Doe (2016)
 Beast
 Beauty Queen
 The Boy and His Tiger
 Broken Cove
 Burn Site
 Bury the Lead
 Cake (2014)
 Capsule
 The Civilian
 Clarity
 The Company Man
 The Crown
 Diablo Run
 Dig
 Dogfight
 Dude (2018)
 Elsewhere
 The End of the Tour (2015)
 Extinction
 Faults (2014)
 The Fixer
 Free Byrd
 Frisco
 From Here to Albion
 Fully Wrecked
 The Gateway (2021)
 Gay Kid and Fat Chick
 The Golden Record
 Half Heard in the Stillness
 Holland, Michigan
 Hot Summer Nights (2017)
 I'm Proud of You
 The Independent
 Ink And Bone
 Inquest
 The Killing Floor
 Last Minute Maids
 The Line
 Line of Duty
 Make A Wish
 Man of Sorrow
 The Mayor of Shark City
 Mississippi Mud
 A Monster Calls (2016)
 Nicholas
 Pan (2015)
 Patient Zero (2018) – then titled Patient Z
 The Politician
 Pox Americana
 Pure O
 Queen of Hearts
 Randle is Benign
 The Remains
 Reminiscence
 Revelation
 The Sea of Trees (2015)
 Section 6
 Seed
 The Shark is Not Working
 Shovel Buddies (2016)
 Sovereign
 The Special Program
 Spotlight (2015)
 Sugar in My Veins
 Superbrat
 Sweetheart
 Tchaikovsky's Requiem
 Time & Temperature
 Where Angels Die

2014 Black List
(17/70 screenplays have been put into production)

 American Made (2017)
 The Babysitter (2017)
 Big Time Adolescence (2019)
 Bird Box (2018)
 Coffee and Kareem (2020)
 The Founder (2016)
 Gifted (2017)
 Josie (2018)
 LBJ (2016)
 Manchester by the Sea (2016)
 Money Monster (2016)
 Morgan (2016)
 My Friend Dahmer (2017)
 On the Basis of Sex (2018)
 The Shallows (2016)
 The Wall (2017)
 Tau (2018)

2015 Black List
(15/81 screenplays have been put into production)

 All the Money in the World (2017)
 American Woman (2018)
 City of Lies (2017)
 Chappaquiddick (2017)
 Crater 
 Dreamland (2019)
 Eli (2019)
 Lucy in the Sky (2019)
 Miss Sloane (2016)
 Operation Finale (2018)
 Rough Night (2017)
 Set It Up (2018)
 Stronger (2017)
 Wish Upon (2017)
 White Boy Rick (2018)

2016 Black List
(14/73 screenplays have been put into production)

 Adrift (2018)
 Bad Education (2019)
 Free Guy (2021)
 Hala (2019)
 Hotel Artemis (2018)
 I Think We're Alone Now (2018)
 I Am Mother (2019)
 I, Tonya (2017)
 Late Night (2019)
 Life Itself (2018)
 Oxygen (2021)
 The Post (2017)
 Roman J. Israel, Esq. (2017)
 Villains (2019)

2017 Black List
(10/76 films have been put into production)

 All My Life (2021)
 American Tabloid
 Arc of Justice
 Ballerina
 Breaking News in Yuba County (2021)
 Brosio
 Call Jane (2022)
 Cancer Inc.
 Come As You Are
 Daddio
 The Dating Game (TBA) - then called Rodney & Sheryl
 Don't Be Evil
 Dorothy & Alice
 Escape
 Escape From the North Pole
 The Expansion Project
 The Fifth Nixon
 Finch (2021) – then titled Bios
 Fubar
 Gadabout
 George
 The Great Nothing
 Greenland
 Green Rush
 The Grownup
 Hack
 Health and Wellness
 Heart of the Beast
 Hughes
 Infinite (2021)
 Innocent Monsters
 Jellyfish Summer
 Jihotties
 Kate (2021)
 Keeper of the Diary
 Key of Genius
 Kill Shelter
 The Kingbreaker
 Let Her Speak
 Liberation
 Lionhunters
 Little Boy
 The Lodge (2019)
 Mad, Bad, And Dangerous to Know
 The Man From Tomorrow
 Meat
 The Mother
 Moxie (2021)
 Newsflash
 On
 One Thousand Paper Cranes
 The Other Lamb
 Panopticon
 The Poison Squad
 Power
 The Prospect
 Queen Elizabeth
 Ruin
 Ruthless
 The Saviors
 Skyward
 The Sleepover (2020)
 Sleep Well Tonight
 Social Justice Warrior
 Strongman
 The Survivor (2021) – then titled  The Boxer
 The Thing About Jellyfish
 This Is Jane
 Trapline
 Valedictorian
 V.I.N.
 When In Doubt, Seduce
 When Lightning Strikes
 Where I End
 The White Devils
 Wyler

2018 Black List
(8/73 screenplays have been put into production)

 (Please) Maternity Leave
 29th Accident
 73 Seconds
 AMA (Ask Me Anything)
 Analytica
 At Risk
 Bag Man
 The Beast
 The Biscuit
 Black Flies
 Blur
 Bolsa Negra
 The Broodmare
 CI-34
 Cobweb 
 Conviction
 Dark
 Dead Dads Club
 The Defender
 Drudge
 Escher
 The Fastest Game
 Frat Boy Genius
 Get Home Safe
 Grace
 Gunfight
 The Half of It
 Happy Anniversary
 Happy Little Trees
 Hare
 In Retrospect
 Infidels
 Inhuman Nature
 The Interventionist
 Isleworth
 Just the Facts
 Just Girl
 The High Note (2020) – then titled Covers
 The Half of It (2020)
 Harry's All Night Hamburgers
 Kill the Leopard
 King Richard (2021)
 The Kings of Cool
 The Liberators
 Little Fish (2021)
 Mamba
 Me & Tammy Faye at the Betty Ford Clinic
 Meet Cute (2022)
 Naked Is the Best Disguise
 Nobody Nothing Nowhere
 One Night in Mississippi
 Our Condolences
 Popular
 Promising Young Woman (2020)
 Queen
 Queen & Slim (2019)
 Queens of the Stoned Age
 Ride
 Rub & Tug
 Saddam & Me
 The Second Life of Ben Haskins
 The Seventh
 Sharon
 Spark
 Tillman
 To the Extreme
 The United States of America v. Bill Gates
 Untitled Coast Guard
 Untitled Syria Project
 Welcome to the Neighborhood
 Wendi
 The Worst Guy of All Time (And the Girl Who Came to Kill Him)
 Young. Wild. Free.
 Your Boy

2019 Black List
(9/66 screenplays have been put into production)

 10-31
 8-Bit Christmas (2021)
 Affairs of State
 An Aftermath
 Apex – by  Aja Gabel and MJ Wesner
 Apex – by Stephen Vitale
 Assisted Living
 Atlanta Onfire
 Barron: A Tale of Love, Loss, & Legacy
 Betty Ford – adapted to television
 Black Mitzvah
 Blue Slide Park
 Breathe
 The Broker
 Can You Tell Me How?
 Cicada
 The Diamond as Big as the Ritz
 Dollhouse
 Doll Wars
 Don't Go in the Water
 Don't Worry Darling (2022)
 Field of View
 First Ascent – adapted to television
 First Harvest
 Girlfriend on Mars
 Grandma Wants to Die
 Helldiver
 High On Christmas
 The House is Not for Sale
 I Heart Murder
 Klein
 Knock at the Cabin (2023) – then titled The Cabin at the End of the World
 The Laborer
 A Magical Place Called Glendale
 The Man in the Woods
 Meet Cute
 The Menu (2022)
 The Mother (2022)
 Move On
 My Boyfriend's Wedding
 No Good Deed
 Nomads
 The Perdition in Liege
 Pod
 The Process
 Refuge
 The Repossession
 Resurrection (2022)
 Ripple
 Rumours
 Say Something Nice
 The Searchers
 The Showrunner
 Sister
 Shut In (2022)
 Stampede
 Super Dad
 The Swells
 T
 They Cloned Tyrone (2022)
 This Is Going To Hurt
 Til Death
 The Traveler
 The Unbearable Weight of Massive Talent (2022)
 Voicemails for Isabelle
 Wayward

2020 Black List
(6/80 screenplays have been put into production)

 1MDB
 Annalise & Song
 Anything's Possible (2022) – then titled What If?
 Bella
 A Big, Bold, Beautiful Journey
 Bikram
 Birdies
 The Black Belt
 Blood Ties
 Borderline
 The Boy Who Died
 Bring Me Back
 Bubble & Squeak
 Chang Can Dunk (2023)
 Cosmic Sunday
 Crush on You
 The Culling
 Dust
 Earworm
 Emancipation (2022)
 Emergency (2022)
 Enemies Within
 Excelsior
 Fight or Flight
 Fish in a Tree
 Flight Risk
 Forever Hold Your Peace
 Frenemy
 Gabi Seems Different
 Generation Leap
 Get Lite
 Good Chance
 The Gorge
 Gusher
 Handsome Stranger
 Headhunter
 Here Come the Bandits
 High Society
 Horsegirl
 I.S.S. 
 If You Were the Last 
 Lurker
 Magazine Dreams 
 The Man in the Yard
 Margot
 May December 
 Mouse
 Murder in the White House
 My Dear You
 Nanny (2022)
 Neither Confirm Nor Deny
 The Neutral Corner
 Occupied
 The Peak
 Plush
 Possum Song
 Reality
 Reptile Dysfunction
 Rewired
 Ripper
 Ruby
 St. Simmons
 Saturday Night Ghost Club
 The Sauce
 Sharper 
 A Single Point of Failure
 State Lines
 Story
 Suncoast
 Tin Roof Rusted
 Towers
 Trespasser
 Two Faced
 The U.S.P.S.
 Uncle Wick
 Viceland
 Video Nasty
 War Face
 The Women of Route 40
 Yom Kippur

2021 Black List
(1/73 screenplays have been put into production)

 Abbi and the Eighth Wonder
 Air Jordan
 Apex – by Jeremy Robbins
 Ballast
 Barron's Cove
 Believe Me
 Bella
 Blackpill
 Candlewood
 Carriage Hill
 Cauliflower
 Challengers
 Chicago For One
 Cruel Summer
 The College Dropout
 The Dark
 Dennis Rodman's 48 Hours in Vegas
 The Devil Herself
 Divorce Party
 False Truth
 The Family Plan
 Fiendish
 The Fire Outside
 Follow
 Four Assassins (and a Funeral)
 From Little Acorns Grow
 Go Dark
 Grizz
 Hard To Get
 Hello Universe
 Homecoming
 Hot Girl Summer
 Hotel Hotel Hotel Hotel
 A Hufflepuff Love Story
 An Ideal Woman
 Idol
 Indigo
 In The End
 It Was You
 Jellyfish Days
 Killer Instinct
 Killers and Diplomats
 Lady Krylon
 Lift
 Loud
 The Masked Singer
 Max and Tony's Epic One-Night Stand
 Mercury
 Michael Bay: The Epic Biopic
 Mimi
 Mr. Benihana
 A Nice Indian Boy
 Operation Milk & Cookies
 Rabbit Season
 Sandpiper
 See How They Run
 Shania!
 Skeleton Tree
 Sleep Solution
 St. Mary's Catholic School presents The Vagina Monologues
 Symphony of Survival
 Thicker Than Ice
 The Villain
 Ultra
 The Unbound
 Wait List
 The Way You Remember Me
 Ways to Hide in Winter
 Weird
 Wheels Come Off
 Whittier
 Worst. Dinner. Ever
 Yasuke

2022 Black List

 42.6 Years
 A Guy Goes to Therapy
 The Americano
 An Oakland Holiday
 Beachwood
 Baby Boom
 The Boy Houdini
 Break Point
 Better Luck Next Time
 Below
 Black Dogs
 Black Kite
 Beachwood
 Colors of Authority
 Clementine
 Cheat Day
 Caravan
 Chatter
 Craigshaven
 Court 17
 Dying for You 
 Dumb Blonde
 The Demolition Expert
 Eternity
 Fog of War
 Gather the Ashes
 GOAT
 Going for Two 
 The House in the Crooked Forest 
 The Homestead
 Himbo
 It's a Wonderful Story
 I Love You Now and Forever
 It's Britney, Bitch
 Jambusters
 JERRY!
 Jingle Bell Heist
 Let's Go Again
 Life of the Party
 Madden
 The Midnight Pool
 Match Cut
 Mega Action Cut
 Marriage Bracket
 Oh The Humanity
 Pikesville Sweep
 Popular
 Pop
 The Pack
 Pure
 Pizza Girl
 Pumping Black
 Resurfaced
 Ripple
 Ravenswood
 Semper Maternus
 Subversion
 The Sisters
 The Seeker
 Sang Froid
 There You Are
 They Came from a Broken World
 The Twelve Dancing Princesses
 Total Landscaping
 Trap
 Undo
 Viva Mexico
 Vitus
 Weary Ride the Belmonts
 Wildfire
 What We Become
 Wild
 White Mountains
 You're My Best Friend

Notes

References

External links
 

Film production
Unproduced screenplays
2004 introductions